Palimpsest: A Journal on Women, Gender, and the Black International is a biannual peer reviewed academic journal covering work by and about women of the African diaspora and their communities in the Atlantic and Indian Ocean worlds. It was established in 2012 and is published by State University of New York Press. The editors-in-chief are Tracy Denean Sharpley-Whiting and Tiffany Ruby Patterson-Myers (Vanderbilt University).

Palimpsest is listed in the Modern Language Association's International Bibliography.

References

External links 

African studies journals
Publications established in 2012
English-language journals
Biannual journals
Gender studies journals
SUNY Press academic journals
Philosophy Documentation Center academic journals